Linli may refer to:

Linli County, a county in Hunan, China
Linli Township (林里乡), a township in Mianning County, Sichuan, China

See also
Lin Li (disambiguation)